The Sugarloaf School is a school located east of Jerome, Idaho that was listed on the National Register of Historic Places in 1983.  It was built in 1924 by master stonemason H.T. Pugh who popularized the use of lava rock in the Jerome area.

References

See also
 List of National Historic Landmarks in Idaho
 National Register of Historic Places listings in Jerome County, Idaho

1924 establishments in Idaho
Buildings and structures in Jerome County, Idaho
School buildings completed in 1924
School buildings on the National Register of Historic Places in Idaho
National Register of Historic Places in Jerome County, Idaho